A National Data Repository (NDR) is a data bank that seeks to preserve and promote a country's natural resources data, particularly data related to the petroleum exploration and production (E&P) sector.

A National Data Repository is normally established by an entity that governs, controls and supports the exchange, capture, transference and distribution of E&P information, with the final target to provide the State with the tools and information to assure the growth, govern-ability, control, independence and sovereignty of the industry.

The two fundamental reasons for a country to establish an NDR are to preserve data generated inside the country by the industry, and to promote investments in the country by utilizing data to reduce the exploration, production, and transportation business risks.

Countries take different approaches towards preserving and promoting their natural resources data. The approach varies according to a country's natural resources policies, level of openness, and its attitude towards foreign investment.

Data types
NDRs store a vast array of data related to a country's natural resources. This includes wells, well log data, well reports, core samples, seismic surveys, post-stack seismic, field data/tapes, seismic (acquisition/processing) reports, production data, geological maps and reports, license data and geological models.

Funding models
Some NDRs are financed entirely by a country's government. Others are industry-funded. Still some are hybrid systems, funded in part by industry and government.
NDRs typically charge fees for data requests and for data loading. The cost differs significantly between countries. In some cases an annual membership is charged to oil companies to store and access the data in the NDR.

Standards body
Energistics is the global energy standards resource center for the upstream oil and gas industry.

Energistics National Data Repository Work Group:
The standards body is Energistics.

Energistics-standards-directory
Global regulators of upstream oil and natural gas information, including seismic, drilling, production and reservoir data, formed the National Data Repository (NDR) Work Group in 2008 to collaborate on the development of data management standards and to assist emerging nations with hydrocarbon reserves to better collect, maintain and deliver oil and gas data to the public and to the industry.

Ten countries, led by the Netherlands, Norway and the United Kingdom, formed NDR to share best practices and to formalize the development and deployment of data management standards for regulatory agencies. The other countries involved in the NDR Work Group's formation are Australia, Canada, India, Kenya, New Zealand, South Africa and the United States.

Annual NDR Conference: Approximately every 18 months Energistics organizes a National Data Repository Conference. The purpose is to provide government and regulatory agencies from around the world an opportunity to attend a series of workshops dedicated to developing data exchange standards, improving communications with the oil and gas industry and learning data management techniques for natural resources information.

Society of Exploration Geophysicists and The International Oil and Gas Producers Association
The SEG is the custodian of the SEG standards which are used for the exchange, retention and release of seismic data.  They are commonly used by National Data Repositories with the SEGD and SEGY being the field and processed exchange standards respectively.

NDRs around the world

Click here to see a map of the NDRs around the world

See also
Energistics
Norwegian Petroleum Directorate
Oil and Gas Authority
Oil and gas industry in the United Kingdom
Petroleum exploration in Guyana
Professional Petroleum Data Management Association (PPDM)

Notes

External links
Energistics: National Data Repository Work Group
National Data Repositories: the case for open data in the oil and gas industry
Society of Exploration Geophysicists

Data management
Open standards
Hydrocarbons
Geophysics organizations